Click, Like, Share is a Philippine anthology streaming television series starring various ABS-CBN Star Magic and Rise artists, directed by Emmanuel "Manny" Quindo Palo and Andoy Ranay, and produced by ABS-CBN Entertainment, Dreamscape Entertainment, and KreativDen Entertainment. Premiered on June 5, 2021, on iWantTFC, it focuses on the negative effects of the excessive use of social media, especially on the youth.

The series was renewed for a third season, which was released on iWantTFC in January 2022.

Premise 
 Click, Like, Share presents stories of people who depend on social media to connect with others and/or express themselves, but later on invite danger into their lives when they start using it recklessly.

Episodes

Series overview

Season 1 (June 2021) 
The episodes for this season were released every Saturday at 6:00 PM (PST) starting June 5, 2021 on KTX.ph, iWantTFC, and TFC IPTV.

<onlyinclude>

Season 2 (September 2021)
The episodes for this season were released every Friday at 8:00 PM (PST) starting September 3, 2021 on iWantTFC. Two days after, it airs every Sunday on Kapamilya Channel, Kapamilya Online Live, and A2Z at 8:30 PM (PST).
<onlyinclude>

Season 3 (January 2022)
The episodes for this season will be released every Wednesdays at 8:00 PM (PST) starting January 12, 2022 on iWantTFC.
<onlyinclude>

Official soundtrack 

The official soundtrack for the series was released on May 28, 2021, and consists of tracks mostly featured in season 1 including two earlier released singles "Panaginip" and "Umaga".

Production
Apart from the members of The Gold Squad (Echarri, Diaz, Fedelin, and Brillantes), Danica Ontengco, Renshi de Guzman, Jimuel Pacquiao, and Nio Tria of The Squad Plus were included as part of the first season. That season marked the acting debut for Pacquiao and, most especially, Tria whose mother Cherry Pie Picache is an actress.

In the third season, it was revealed in an iWantTFC event that Elmo Magalona, Vivoree Esclito, JC Alcantara, and Belle Mariano (who was also slated to be part of the second season of another iWantTFC series He's Into Her) were to be part of the season's cast members, and seasoned director Andoy Ranay serves as the series's director beginning this season.

Release

Broadcast

The show's first two seasons had its Philippine TV Premiere from August 8 to September 26, 2021 on Yes Weekend Sunday primetime on Kapamilya Channel, Kapamilya Online Live and A2Z replacing the first season of He's Into Her and was replaced by Melting Me Softly.

The third season premiered from December 4 and 11, 2022 on Yes Weekend Sunday primetime on Kapamilya Channel, Kapamilya Online Live and A2Z replacing Lyric and Beat and it was replaced by the reaired first season of Almost Paradise. It also aired international via TFC.

References

External links
 Click, Like, Share on iWantTFC

IWantTFC original programming
2021 Philippine television series debuts
2021 web series debuts
Television series about teenagers
Television series about social media
Philippine anthology television series
Philippine thriller television series